{{safesubst:#invoke:RfD|||month = March
|day = 20
|year = 2023
|time = 08:49
|timestamp = 20230320084955

|content=
REDIRECT TV One Pakistan

}}